The Reality Bug is the fourth book in the Pendragon series by D. J. MacHale. The world is all about peoples' imaginations. People create their own fantasy worlds and live inside their dreams.

 Grade Level: 5th-8th
 Genre: fiction/adventure
 Setting(s): lifelight, second earth, zadaa, and veelox
 POV: mainly 1st person

Plot
Bobby begins on the territory of Veelox, with Gunny, where they land in the dark room outside the Veelox flume. Bobby and Gunny encounter Saint Dane and believe they have him cornered, however, twenty realistic holograms of the villain suddenly appear around him, but Bobby found the right one and fought him, but Saint Dane called out Eelong and Bobby was scared that he was going with Saint Dane so he let go, allowing Saint Dane to escape. Bobby and Gunny decide to split. Gunny will immediately go to Eelong and report back later with news while Bobby stays on Veelox because Saint Dane had mentioned that it is on the verge of destruction.

Bobby hates the darkness and is worried if the inhabitants of Veelox are floating giants after meeting Aja Killian, the local Traveler, in the form of a massive holographic face. Bobby doesn't know if the huge hologram is life-sized. He meets up with a very ordinary, humanoid Aja in a city much like those on Second Earth, called Rubic City. The only differences are that it is deserted, and there is a huge structure called the Lifelight pyramid looming over the town.

Aja explains that Lifelight is a virtual reality world—a computer that gives people's desires the appearance of being real. Almost everyone on Veelox is in it, living out their own perfect virtual lives.

She takes Bobby through it, and he is amazed at the vedders, who are the "physical" caretakers of the bodies, and the phaders, computer geniuses running the place. She is one of the latter.

Bobby experiences his own fantasy "jump"; he meets his family, plays with his dog, Marley, and plays a basketball game where he and his team simply cannot lose. It's a tight game, though. He has to be dragged out by Aja after going into OT.

Aja then explains that, because Lifelight is so perfect, hardly anyone leaves. No food is being made. The territory is dying. However, she has a way to stop Lifelight....a Reality Bug that preys on fears to make it all less-than-perfect. She then takes Bobby to where he left off in his fantasy, but uses her virus to make it different. His opponents are taller, his coach has a heart attack, and he is injured.

While in the locker room Aja tells him is this is how to save the territory. However, a Saint Dane hologram appears and tells them that the bug is working "far better than you could imagine".

Saint Dane is right. The Reality Bug has become far too realistic; its use of fears to dilute the jumps has a placebo effect on people, in that if they die in their fantasy, the death is real. Aja put Lifelight into suspense to keep the jumpers safe and to try to find a solution. Only one man can stop the rapidly evolving virus; Dr. Zetlin, who invented Lifelight and the only one to know of the origin code, the key to purging the bug from the processing code.

Zetlin is in Lifelight. He is in the alpha grid, which can be brought online independently of the rest of Lifelight. However, he can't simply be pulled out. Bobby would need help in the danger to come.

Bobby goes to Zadaa and convinces its Traveler, Loor, to come along to help him defeat the nightmares. She agrees, and they start the alpha grid up again, with Aja acting as phader-vedder. They plan to get the origin code from Dr. Zetlin and purge Lifelight of the Reality Bug.

However, the software is malfunctioning. Rather than send them into Zetlin's fantasy, it sends them into the "Wild West" and thence into Aja's own residence. They meet Saint Dane twice therein before they are pulled out.

Aja takes them to Zetlin's fantasy, where Zetlin resides in a massive building called the 'Barbican', which can either stand upright or on its side. The first level of its structure is a tropical jungle filled with plant-animal life forms. The second level is a sort of large pool, with racing motorboats following lights. The level after that is a snow-covered landscape, where Bobby has to finish a race called slickshot in which six skaters need to pick up red balls and put them into buckets. Unfortunately, only four people can finish the race. Bobby finishes the race (with a bit of intervention from Loor) and sees that Zetlin is actually one of the racers, a popular sixteen-year-old called the "Z" in his fantasy. Bobby, Loor and Aja convince him to spill the code, which turns out to be "zero."  When Aja enters the code, it turns out that Saint Dane sabotaged it. The Reality Bug takes physical form (a black ameoba-like shapeshifter), and chases Bobby, Zetlin, and Loor around Zetlin's fantasy home, and even into the real world when it grows too powerful to be contained by Lifelight. They leave Zetlin's jump and shut down all of Lifelight, and the Reality Bug is destroyed. The Travelers feel they have beaten Saint Dane—again.

But at a ceremony congratulating Aja and explaining the loss of Lifelight, Dr. Sever, prime director of the program, steps up. She turns out to be Saint Dane in disguise, and she stirs up the crowd, promising to bring Lifelight back online. He/She succeeds, everyone reenters Lifelight, and Saint Dane receives his first victory.

After Plot

After Saint Dane gets his first Territory, Bobby abruptly ends his journal. He has Aja finish it, and after it is finally ended, Courtney and Mark go to an old man named Dorney to become acolytes. After this, they decided to go to the flume in Stony Brook to leave clothes. Here, Mark, unknowingly, activates the flume when he calls out "Eelong". First Saint Dane come, giving them a bag saying, "A present for Pendragon". As he leaves, he says, "What once ones, is no longer". Just a few seconds after he leaves, Bobby shows up. Mark gives him the bag, which turns out to be Gunny's hand in a bag. The book ends with Bobby saying, " Wait for my journal. and whatever you do, do not activate the flumes. That's exactly what Saint Dane wants, and it is not the way things were meant to be." before departing to Eelong.

Characters in "The Reality Bug"
Robert "Bobby" Pendragon - The main character of the story, a teenager. The Lead Traveler, according to Alder, trying to stop Saint Dane won Veelox.

See also

 Simulated reality
 Simulated reality in fiction

The Pendragon Adventure
2003 American novels
American fantasy novels
Holography in fiction
Novels about virtual reality
Malware in fiction